

Technology 
The acronym CCIS may refer to:
 Pacific Asia Conference on Information Systems.
 Pan-American Association on Computational Interdisciplinary Sciences.